Sturgeon Bay/Richards Beach Water Aerodrome  is an registered aerodrome located northwest of Sturgeon Bay, Ontario, Canada.

References

Registered aerodromes in Ontario
Seaplane bases in Ontario